Steamcon was one of the largest steampunk conventions/symposia in the United States. Located in the Seattle area of Washington state, Steamcon held its first symposium in 2009.

Steamcon grew out of the desire of its founders to host a steampunk event in greater Seattle. The idea to start the event was hatched at the local science fiction convention Norwescon in 2008 when multiple people expressed an interest to hold an event devoted exclusively to steampunk.  Although the idea for a Seattle area Steampunk convention referred to as SteamCon was first used as the basis for a panel at Anglicon 6 in Seattle in May 1993.

Past symposia

2009
The first Steamcon was held October 23–25, 2009 at the Seattle Airport Marriott in Seatac, Washington. The convention in its first year had 1,350 people attend, making it one of the largest, if not the largest, steampunk devoted conventions in North America.

Guests of Honor
 Author Guest of Honor: Tim Powers
 Artist Guest of Honor: Paul Guinan
 Musical Guests of Honor: Abney Park

2010
The second annual Steamcon was held November 19–21, 2010. The host venues were the Hilton Seattle Airport Hotel and the Seattle Airport Marriott.  The theme was "Weird Weird West."  Approximately 1,950 guests were in attendance.

Guests of Honor
 Author Guest of Honor: James Blaylock
 Artist Guest of Honor: Jake Von Slatt
 Games Guest of Honor: Shane Hensley

2011

The third annual Steamcon was held October 14–16, 2011. The host venue was the Bellevue Hyatt Regency Bellevue.  The theme was "20,000 Leagues Under the Sea".  About 2,250 guests were in attendance.

Guests of Honor
 Author Guest of Honor: K.W. Jeter
 Artist Guest of Honor: Gary Gianni
 Musical Guests of Honor: Vagabond Opera

2012
The fourth annual Steamcon was held October 26–28, 2012. The host venue was the Bellevue Hyatt Regency. The theme was "Victorian Monsters".

Guests of Honor
 Author Guest of Honor: Kim Newman (unable to attend)
 Artist Guest of Honor: Joe Benitez
 Musical Guests of Honor: Rasputina
 Monster Hunters of Honor: The League of S.T.E.A.M.

2013
The fifth annual Steamcon was held from October 25–27, 2013. 
The theme was "Around the World".
The venue was the Bellevue Hyatt Regency.

Guests of Honor
 Artist Guest of Honor: Brian Kesinger
 Writer Guest of Honor: S. M. Stirling
 Musical Guest of Honor: Professor Elemental

Cancelled symposium

2014
On March 9, 2014, a post on the Steamcon official Facebook page revealed that Steamcon VI would be cancelled due to a debt of at least $41,500 to Bellevue Hyatt Regency and other organizations.

The 6th annual Steamcon was to be held on October 3–5, 2014. The theme was to be "Mechanical World". The venue would have been the Bellevue Hyatt Regency.

Notes

References

"Steam-Con Announcement(2009)" (Conventions Fans)
"Gogglicious: A Steamcon Report(2009)" (Tor.com)
"Seattle Steamcon Report(2009)" (The WriteRunner)
"Steamcon Scholar Report(2009)" (Steamcon Scholar)
"Steamcon Late Report(2009)" (The Compass Points to M)
"Recap of a Brass Filled Weekend(2009)" (9 Degrees of Yarn & Me)
"Seattle Steamcon(2009)" (Shoe Blog)
"Steamcon Recap(2009)" (The Heliograph)
"A Gaming Point of View" (Review of the Games Rooms at Steamcon II)

External links

Steamcon official website

Steamcon Pinterest

Seattle Area conventions
Recurring events established in 2009
Recurring events disestablished in 2014
Culture of Seattle
Steampunk conventions
Defunct science fiction conventions in the United States